Drymocallis glandulosa, known by the common name sticky cinquefoil and formerly as Potentilla glandulosa, is a plant species in the family Rosaceae.

It is native to western North America from southwestern Canada through the far western United States and California, into Baja California. It is widespread and can be found in many types of habitats.

Description
Drymocallis glandulosa is generally erect in form but it may be small and tuftlike, measuring just a few centimeters high, or tall and slender, approaching  in height. It may or may not have rhizomes.

It is usually coated in hairs, many of which are glandular, giving the plant a sticky texture. The leaves are each divided into several leaflets, with one long terminal leaflet and a few smaller ones widely spaced on each side.

The inflorescence is a cyme of 2 to 30 flowers which are variable in color and size. Each has usually five petals up to a centimeter long which may be white to pale yellow to gold.

Varieties
It is highly variable and there are many varieties and subspecies, some of which intergrade and are not clearly defined. They include:
 Drymocallis glandulosa var. glandulosa
 Drymocallis glandulosa var. reflexa
 Drymocallis glandulosa var. viscida
 Drymocallis glandulosa var. wrangelliana

Ecology
The plant is more common after its habitat is cleared or disturbed, such as by wildfire, clearcutting, or heavy grazing.

It is an important food for several species of mice, including the western harvest mouse, cactus mouse, and California mouse.

References

External links
 
 
 
 

glandulosa
Baja California
Flora of British Columbia
Flora of California
Flora of Idaho
Flora of Montana
Flora of Nevada
Flora of Oregon
Flora of Washington (state)
Flora of the Cascade Range
Flora of the Great Basin
Flora of the Klamath Mountains
Flora of the Sierra Nevada (United States)
Natural history of the California chaparral and woodlands
Natural history of the California Coast Ranges
Natural history of the Peninsular Ranges
Natural history of the San Francisco Bay Area
Natural history of the Santa Monica Mountains
Natural history of the Transverse Ranges
Flora without expected TNC conservation status